Born and Bred was a British light-hearted 1950s-set medical drama series aired on BBC One which ran from 21 April 2002 to 3 August 2005. It was created by Chris Chibnall and Nigel McCrery. Initially the cast was led by James Bolam and Michael French as a father and son who run a cottage hospital in Ormston, a fictitious village in Lancashire, in the 1950s. Bolam's and French's characters were later replaced by characters played by Richard Wilson and Oliver Milburn.

Cast
James Bolam as Dr Arthur Gilder (series 1 to 3)
Michael French as Dr Tom Gilder (series 1 to 3)
Jenna Russell as Deborah Gilder, who chairs the parish council 
Charlotte Salt as Helen Gilder
Ross Little as Michael Gilder
Polly Thompson as Catherine Gilder
Cameron and Jacub Earley (2002–03) and Evan Fortescue (2003–05) as Philip "Pip" Gilder
Peter Gunn as Constable Len Cosgrove
Tracey Childs as Nurse Linda Cosgrove
Maggie Steed as Phyllis Woolf
John Henshaw as Wilf Bradshaw
Naomi Radcliffe as Jean Bradshaw (later Mills)
Samuel J. Hudson as Eddie Mills
Donald Gee as Horace Boynton
Clive Swift as the Reverend Eustacius Brewer
Shirley White and Joan Worswick as the Matthews Sisters
Richard Wilson as Dr Donald Newman (series 3 to 4)
Oliver Milburn as Dr Nick Logan (series 4)
Kelly Harrison as Nancy Brisley (series 4)

Plot
Born and Bred is set in the fictitious village of Ormston in Lancashire during the 1950s. The lead characters are Dr Arthur Gilder and his son Tom, who together run the cottage hospital under the National Health Service. Tom is married to Deborah, who is chairwoman of the parish council, and they have four children, Helen, Michael, Catherine and Philip. The hospital's nurse is Linda Cosgrove, who is married to the village policeman, PC Len Cosgrove. The local pub is run by Phyllis Woolf and the village shop by Horace Boynton. Other characters include the station master, Wilf Bradshaw; his daughter, Jean, who owns a scrapyard and later marries Eddie Mills, a mechanic; and the vicar, the Reverend Eustacius Brewer. Arthur and Tom leave the third series, and are replaced by Dr Donald Newman in the episodes "And Is There Still Honey For Tea?" and Dr Nick Logan in "The Great Leap Forward" respectively, plus Nancy Brisley, Deborah’s sister.

Episodes

Born and Bred first aired on 21 April 2002. After 4 series, 1 Christmas special and 36 regular episodes it ended on 3 August 2005. Each episode is 60 minutes long and aired on BBC One at 8 pm on Sunday. Series 1, Series 2, Series 3 and the Christmas Special were shown on Sundays, while Series 4 was shown on Wednesdays. ITV3 began broadcasting Born and Bred from April 2010. It was being broadcast on ITV3 and is currently being shown on the UK Free to Air TV Channel "True Entertainment". The series last aired in Australia on 7TWO late 2011, Weekdays at 1:15pm,

Locations
The exterior shots of the early series were filmed primarily in and around East Lancashire, mainly in the village of Downham, but some scenes were shot in Helmshore and others in Settle, North Yorkshire. Two railway scenes were filmed on the East Lancashire Railway, but the main railway scenes were shot on the Keighley and Worth Valley Railway.

Home releases
In March 2012 the entire series was re-released on DVD in the UK (Region 2) by Acorn Media UK.

References

External links

Born and Bred, Press Releases & Press Packs, BBC, 25 March 2002
Born and Bred fan and information site

2002 British television series debuts
2005 British television series endings
2000s British drama television series
BBC television dramas
English-language television shows
Television shows set in Lancashire
Television series set in the 1950s